Charles Lewis Low (July 21, 1928 – September 18, 2017) was an American actor.

Low was born in New York City, to a Russian mother and Austrian-Polish father. He achieved his biggest success as Morris "Morrie" Kessler in the Martin Scorsese film Goodfellas (1990). The character of Morrie was famous for his "Morrie's Wig Shop" commercial which is seen as comical, and that coupled with his penchant for pestering Jimmy Conway about money leads most of the characters to see him as a nuisance, setting up his eventual murder by Tommy DeVito. Kessler's character is based on Martin Krugman. He was also known for wearing his dark brown leather blazer.

He has had small roles in other Robert De Niro films, such as The Mission, The King of Comedy, and most notably in Sergio Leone's 1984 film Once Upon a Time in America as Deborah and Fat Moe's father. He also guest starred in a first-season episode of The Sopranos, as Shlomo Teittleman. He can also be seen in Alan Taylor's 2003 film, Kill the Poor.

Low once served as Robert De Niro's real estate consultant and landlord.

Low was a Veteran officer of the United States Army where he attained the rank of Major.

Chuck Low was Jewish.

Filmography

References

External links

1928 births
2017 deaths
American male film actors
American people of German-Jewish descent
American people of Polish descent
Burials at Beth David Cemetery
Jewish American male actors
Male actors from New York City
American landlords
21st-century American Jews